Donald Williamson may refer to:
Don Williamson (1934–2019), American politician
Donald I. Williamson (1922–2016), British scientist